Jakob-Wassermann-Literaturpreis is a Bavarian literary prize. It is granted in honour to the famous German-Jewish writer Jakob Wassermann by the city of Fürth (near Nuremberg) and comes with a donation of 10.000 Euros. The prize was established in 1995.

Recipients
Source:

 1996: Edgar Hilsenrath
 1999: Hilde Domin
 2002: 
 2004: Sten Nadolny
 2006: Uwe Timm
 2007: Robert Schindel
 2008: 
 2010: Feridun Zaimoglu
 2012:  Gerhard Roth
 2014: Urs Widmer
 2016: 
 2018: Barbara Honigmann
 2020: Clemens J. Setz
 2023: Eva Menasse

References

Literary awards of Bavaria
German literary awards
1995 establishments in Germany
Awards established in 1995